The Play  is a 2013 Bengali murder mystery thriller film written and directed by Ranjay Ray Choudhury.  The film features Rajesh Sharma, Indrasish Roy, Mumtaz Sorcar in the lead roles. The film revolves around a theatre group where the entire theatre group gets devastated by a series of murders. The filming began in December 2012 and was wrapped up by January 2013. The film was released on 6 December 2013.

Plot 
A famous theatre group in Kolkata is ravaged when the members of the group gets killed one by one in a span of a single night. Only three of the members survive Mainak (Indrasish Roy),Ishika (Mumtaz Sorcar) and Rishabh (Rajdeep Gupta). The task of finding out the truth befalls on Mainak, but the answers he was looking for is not what he ends up finding.

Cast 
Ambikesh Sanyal (Rajesh Sharma)
Mainak (Indrasish Roy)
Ishika (Mumtaz Sorcar)
Rishabh (Rajdeep Gupta)
Ananya (Sampurna Chakraborty) and others

Music
The music and the background score of The Play has been composed by *(Joy Sarkar).

Soundtrack 
"Bhromor Koio Giya" - (Anushree Gupta)
"Ekta Beparoa Din Ashe" - (Somchanda Bhattacharya), (Timir Biswas)	
"Ke Barabe Haat" - (Kushal Paul)
"Megh Kuyashay Amar Shohor" - (Joy Sarkar)	
"Bhromor Koio Giya" (Remix)
"The Play" Theme

References

External links 

2013 films
Bengali-language Indian films
2010s Bengali-language films
Indian mystery thriller films
2013 thriller films
2010s mystery thriller films
Murder mystery films